At  the Großer Ahrensberg is one of the highest hills in the Solling range, which is located in southern Lower Saxony in Germany.

It is located on the western flanks of the Hellental Graben, through which the river Helle flows, and is surrounded by the Solling-Vogler Nature Park. On the far (south-southeast) side of this graben is the Große Blöße.

The region of the Großer Ahrensberg belongs to the Hoher Solling climatic zone above 400 m, which has high levels of precipitation and low temperatures. These climatic conditions are e.g. still provide a sufficiently healthy environment for beech woods.

Several forest tracks and footpaths meet at the very top of the Großer Ahrensberg.

Hills of Lower Saxony
Solling